Terenthina is a Neotropical genus of butterflies in the family Lycaenidae.

Species
Terenthina terentia (Hewitson, 1868)
Terenthina bradyae (D'Abrera, 1995)

References

 

Eumaeini
Lycaenidae of South America
Lycaenidae genera